The 1967 Army Cadets football team represented the United States Military Academy in the 1967 NCAA University Division football season. In their second year under head coach Tom Cahill, the Cadets compiled an 8–2 record and outscored their opponents 183 to 94.

In the annual Army–Navy Game in December, the Cadets lost 19–14 to the Midshipmen. Army's other loss was to underdog Duke, by three points in early October; the Blue Devils also defeated Navy, by nineteen in November.

After their final home game, a 22–0 shutout of Utah on Veterans Day, the Cadets were 7–1 and prime candidates for the academy's first-ever bowl invitation. In the midst of the Vietnam War, Pentagon officials decided against it, citing the "heavy demands on the players' time" as well as an emphasis on football being "not consistent with the academy's basic mission: to produce career Army officers."
 
No Army players received first-team honors on the All-America team.

Schedule

Personnel

References

Army
Army Black Knights football seasons
Army Cadets football